Hermanów may refer to the following places:
Hermanów, Łódź Voivodeship (central Poland)
Hermanów, Lublin Voivodeship (east Poland)
Hermanów, Świętokrzyskie Voivodeship (south-central Poland)
Hermanów, Greater Poland Voivodeship (west-central Poland)